The Kraichbach is a  right tributary of the Rhine running through the German state of Baden-Württemberg. Its source is in the Kraichgau region near the municipality of Sternenfels. The brook then flows to the northwest through Kürnbach, Oberderdingen, Kraichtal, Ubstadt-Weiher, Bad Schönborn and Kronau, all in the district of Karlsruhe. It then enters the district of Rhein-Neckar-Kreis and flows through Sankt Leon-Rot, Reilingen, Hockenheim and Ketsch before joining the Rhine.

Notable locations near the stream include Gochsheim Castle, Schloss Kislau prison, and the Hockenheimring racing circuit.

References

Rivers of Baden-Württemberg
Rivers of Germany